Krogulcza may refer to the following places in Poland:

Krogulcza Mokra
Krogulcza Sucha